Greek National Road 26 is a national highway of Greece. It connects Elassona with Greek National Road 15 north of Kalampaka.

26
Roads in Thessaly